The Tehuantepec jackrabbit (Lepus flavigularis) is a jackrabbit endemic to Mexico.

Description
It is easily distinguished from other species by two black stripes that run from the base of the ears to the nape, and by its white flanks. Its underparts are white, its upperparts are bright-brown washed with black, the rump is gray, and the tail is black. It is one of the largest jackrabbits and has large ears and legs. Adults weigh about 3.5 to 4 kilograms.

Distribution
The Tehuantepec jackrabbit is a rare endemic of Oaxaca, Mexico, and is only found along savannas and grassy dunes on the shores of a salt water lagoon connected to the Gulf of Tehuantepec in the Istmo de Tehuantepec region. Three small populations persist isolated from each other.

The former distribution of the Tehuantepec jackrabbit is not documented in detail, but it is estimated that its historic geographic range along the Mexican Pacific Coast on the Isthmus of Tehuantepec from Salina Cruz in Oaxaca to Tonalá in Chiapas, an area of perhaps only 5000 square km.

Habitat and ecology
Tropical dry savannas dominated by native grasses (Bouteloua, Paspalum) with an overstory of sparse bushes of nanche (Byrsonima crassifolia), and scattered trees of morro (Crescentia) are selected by the Tehuantepec jackrabbit. The Tehuantepec Jackrabbit is also found in coastal grassy dunes with Opuntia decumbens, Opuntia tehuantepecana, and Sabal mexicana.

Home ranges overlap with one or more individuals regardless of sex and age, and home range size is about 50 ha with core areas of 9 ha for adult jackrabbits. The Tehuantepec jackrabbit is nocturnal and crepuscular, and during the diurnal hours it rests in forms under bushes or grasses.

Native mammals that coexist with the Tehuantepec jackrabbit are the eastern cottontail (Sylvilagus floridanus), the nine-banded armadillo (Dasypus novemcinctus), the hooded and western hog-nosed skunks (Mephitis macroura, Conepatus mesoleucus), the Virginia opossum (Didelphis marsupialis), the gray mouse opossum (Tlacuatzin canescens), the gray fox (Urocyon cinereoargenteus), the common raccoon (Procyon lotor), and the coyote (Canis latrans). Of these, the gray fox and the coyote are native predators of the Tehuantepec jackrabbit.

Reproduction
The Tehuantepec jackrabbit has a polygynous mating system. The length of the breeding season may extend from February to December, with a peak in reproduction during the rainy season (from May to October). The litter size is one to four embryos, but the number of litters produced per female per year remains to be investigated.

Conservation
The Tehuantepec jackrabbit is listed as critically endangered in the Mexican Official Norm NOM-059-ECOL-2001, and as an endangered species by the International Union for the Conservation of Nature (IUCN) Red List of Endangered Species.

Threats
The Tehuantepec jackrabbit is jeopardized by habitat loss and fragmentation, poaching, small population size, and genetic isolation. Introduction of exotic grasses, frequent and induced fires, agricultural and cattle-raising activities, and human settlements are deteriorating the floristic diversity and native vegetation structure in savannas inhabited by Tehuantepec jackrabbits. Locally, the Tehuantepec jackrabbit is taken occasionally as subsistence hunting, and very occasionally as pets in rural communities. Predation by the gray fox and the coyote is the major cause of mortality of the jackrabbit. However, poachers may come from nearby cities and decimate populations in a few nights of hunting.

References

Cervantes, F. A., and C. Lorenzo. 1997. Morphometric differentiation of rabbits (Sylvilagus and Romerolagus) and jackrabbits (Lepus) of Mexico. Gibier Faune Sauvage 14:405-425.
Sántis, E. C. 2002. Distribución y abundancia de la liebre endémica Lepus flavigularis y el conejo castellano Sylvilagus floridanus (Mammalia: Lagomorpha) en el Istmo de Tehuantepec, Oaxaca, México. Tesis de Licenciado en Biología. Universidad de Ciencias y Artes de Chiapas. Tuxtla Gutierrez, Chiapas, México.
Vargas, Z. 2001. Valoración de los vertebrados terrestres por los huaves y zapotecas de la zona lagunar del Istmo de Tehuantepec, Oaxaca. Tesis de Maestría. El Colegio de la Frontera Sur. Chiapas, México.
Villa, B., and F. A. Cervantes. 2003. Los mamíferos de México. Iberoamericana. Instituto de Biología, Universidad Nacional Autónoma de México. México, D. F. 140 pp. and CD-rom.

Lepus
Endemic mammals of Mexico
Fauna of the Southern Pacific dry forests
Istmo de Tehuantepec
Endangered biota of Mexico
Endangered fauna of North America
Mammals described in 1844
Taxa named by Johann Andreas Wagner